Tarawari may refer to:
 Taraori, a town in Haryana, India
 Tarawari language, spoken in Khyber Pakhtunkhwa, Pakistan